Dr. Ambedkar Nagar–Kalakund Heritage Train  is a metre-gauge passenger train of the Indian Railways, which runs between Dr. Ambedkar Nagar railway station, Mhow in Madhya Pradesh and Kalakund in Madhya Pradesh. It is being operated with 52965/52966 train numbers, which run once in a day.Now closed from 01.02.2023

Route and halts

The halts of the train are:

Average speed and frequency

The Dr. Ambedkar Nagar–Kalakund Heritage Train runs with an average speed of 6 km/h and completes 15 km in 2 hours 20 minutes. The 52966/Kalakund–Dr. Ambedkar Nagar Heritage Train runs with an average speed of 16 km/h and completes 15 km in 56 minutes.

Coach composite

The train consist of 4 coaches :

Traction

Both trains are hauled by a Mhow Loco Shed based YDM-4 diesel locomotive from Dr. Ambedkar Nagar to Kalakund and vice versa. Banker locomotive is attached from Kalakund to Patalpani due to steep incline .

See also 

 Mhow Indore Passenger
 Akola–Ratlam rail line

Notes

References

External links 

 52965/Dr. Ambedkar Nagar - Kalakund Heritage Train (UnReserved)
 52966/Kalakund - Dr. Ambedkar Nagar Heritage Train (UnReserved)

Rail transport in Madhya Pradesh
Slow and fast passenger trains in India
Transport in Mhow